Caenispirillum deserti is a Gram-negative, Vibrio-shaped, aerobic, spheroplast-forming and motile bacterium from the genus of Caenispirillum which has been isolated from the salt desert in Kutch in India.

References 

 

Rhodospirillales
Bacteria described in 2015